Only Built for Infinity Links is the only studio album by American trap duo Unc & Phew. It was released through Quality Control Music, Capitol Records, Motown Records, and YRN the Label on October 7, 2022. The album contains guest appearances from Mustard, YoungBoy Never Broke Again, Young Thug, Gunna, Summer Walker, Birdman, and Gucci Mane. It was the last project that Takeoff released in his life time as he was shot and killed just twenty five days after the release of the album on November 1, 2022.

Background
Quavo and Takeoff worked on the album over a two-year period and "modeled elements of the cover art" on Kanye West and Jay-Z's collaboration for Watch the Throne (2011) as well as Outkast. The title is a reference to Raekwon's 1995 debut album Only Built 4 Cuban Linx..., with Takeoff claiming that Raekwon approved of the title, as well as a reference to the "unbreakable bond" that Quavo and Takeoff have as uncle and nephew, respectively. The album was notably made without input from Offset of Migos despite no formal split of the trio; Quavo also stated in an interview that he would like to see his and Takeoff's career "as a duo".

Commercial performance
Only Built for Infinity Links debuted at number seven on the US Billboard 200 chart, earning 33,000 album-equivalent units (including 2,500 copies in pure album sales) in its first week. The album also accumulated a total of 41.1 million on-demand streams of the album's songs.

Track listing

Personnel
Performers
 Quavo – rap vocals
 Takeoff – rap vocals
 YoungBoy Never Broke Again – rap vocals (track 6)
 DJ Durel – keyboards (7–10, 12, 15, 16, 18), programming (7, 8, 10, 12, 15, 16, 18)
 Gunna – rap vocals (8)
 Young Thug – rap vocals (8)
 Summer Walker – vocals (11)
 Birdman – rap vocals (15)

Technical
 Colin Leonard – mastering
 Larry Anthony – mastering (15, 16)
 DJ Durel – mixing (1–17), engineering (all tracks)
 Quavo – mixing (1–17)
 Mike Dean – mixing (18)

Charts

Weekly charts

Year-end charts

References

2022 albums
Quavo albums
Takeoff (rapper) albums
Albums produced by DJ Durel
Albums produced by Mars (record producer)
Albums produced by Mike Dean (record producer)
Albums produced by DJ Mustard
Albums produced by Zaytoven
Quality Control Music albums
Motown albums
Capitol Records albums